Köhnə Xudat (also, Kohna Khudat) is a village and municipality in the Khachmaz District of Azerbaijan. It has a population of 1,252.

References 

Populated places in Khachmaz District